Alexander Wilbourne Weddell (April 6, 1876 – January 1, 1948) was an American diplomat. He served as United States ambassador to Argentina from 1933 to 1939 and to Spain from 1939 to 1942.

Weddell was born in Richmond, Virginia, and attended George Washington University. On May 31, 1923, he married a wealthy widow, Virginia Chase Steedman. He served as president of the Virginia Historical Society from 1943 until his death.

Weddell was the author or editor of several books, including:

A Memorial Volume of Virginia Historical Portraiture (1930)
Richmond, Virginia, in Old Prints (1932)
Introduction to Argentina (1939)
Portraiture in the Virginia Historical Society (1945)

Weddell and his wife died in a train accident near Otterville, Missouri on January 1, 1948.

Virginia House
The Weddells' Richmond home, Virginia House, was constructed from material from an older house located in Priory Park, Warwick, England. He purchased the Warwick property in 1926 and transported it over two years later. The rebuilt house now belongs to the Virginia Historical Society and is open to the public.

Further reading
 
 Virginius Cornick Hall Jr., Portraits in the Collection of the Virginia Historical Society (1981), pp. 254–255. .

External links
 Virginia House
 Virginia Historical Society biography

1876 births
1948 deaths
Writers from Richmond, Virginia
Ambassadors of the United States to Argentina
Ambassadors of the United States to Spain
Railway accident deaths in the United States
Accidental deaths in Missouri
20th-century American diplomats
20th-century American historians
American male non-fiction writers
United States Foreign Service personnel
Historians from Virginia
20th-century American male writers